The Wera River is a river of Flores, East Nusa Tenggara province, Indonesia, about 1500 km east of the capital Jakarta.

Hydrology 
The Wera River flows in the Manggarai Timur Regency and during wet season, the current is quite high to threaten the damage of "Wae Wera Bridge" in the village of Nanga Baras, Sambi Rampas district, or the northern main traffic route of Flores.

Geography 
The river flows in the middle to the north of Flores with predominantly tropical savanna climate (designated as Aw in the Köppen-Geiger climate classification). The annual average temperature in the area is 26 °C. The warmest month is November, when the average temperature is around 30 °C, and the coldest is February, at 23 °C. The average annual rainfall is 1686 mm. The wettest month is January, with an average of 302 mm rainfall, and the driest is September, with 8 mm rainfall.

See also
List of rivers of Indonesia
List of rivers of Lesser Sunda Islands

References

Rivers of Flores Island (Indonesia)
Rivers of Indonesia